Running Wild is a racing video game released on October 7, 1998 for the Sony PlayStation developed by Blue Shift Studios and published by 989 Studios.

Gameplay
Each player takes on the role of a bipedal anthropomorphic animal, jumping over all sorts of obstacles in a foot race. Each of the game's six tracks is set in a vastly different locale, presenting unique challenges for every animal on the roster. Players choose from six characters, each with a different skill set. The elephant is the strongest, the bull is the most agile, and the zebra is the fastest. Hidden boss characters can be unlocked in the game's Challenge mode, while Time Trial allows players to race against their own best times.

Characters
Brazz the zebra
Gwynne the rabbit
Boris the elephant
The General the mountain goat
Coronado the bull
Mei Ling the panda

Secret characters
Blizzaro the snowman
Pyro the firefighter
Rex the tyrannosaurus rex
Tox the toxic waste character
Kostra the desert skeleton
Lunar the astronaut

Development
A preliminary title for the game was "Freakin' Fast". Trademark issues were cited as the main reason behind the change. The game was to be published by Universal Interactive

Reception

The UK Official PlayStation Magazine rated Running Wild a 5 out of 10.

References

External links
 

1998 video games
Multiplayer and single-player video games
PlayStation (console) games
PlayStation (console)-only games
Racing video games
Sony Interactive Entertainment games
Universal Interactive games
Video games about animals
Video games developed in the United States
Video games scored by David Bergeaud